P. gracilis may refer to:
 Pachyaena gracilis, an extinct mammal species in the genus Pachyaena
 Palaeospheniscus gracilis, an extinct penguin species
 Pandercetes gracilis, the lichen huntsman spider, a spider species found in Australia
 Panulirus gracilis, a lobster species in the genus Panulirus
 Paradoxides gracilis, a trilobite species
 Paraprotopteryx gracilis, an extinct enantiornithine bird species of the Early Cretaceous
 Pearcea gracilis, a plant species endemic to Ecuador
 Penstemon gracilis, the slender beardtongue, a wild flower species of the genus Penstemon found in Minnesota
 Petaurus gracilis, the mahogany glider, an endangered possum species
 Phlox gracilis, the slender phlox, a plant species
 Physalaemus gracilis, a frog species
 Plasmodium gracilis, a parasite species
 Plectomyces gracilis, a fungus species
 Pleurothallis gracilis, an orchid species endemic to Brazil
 Polygonia gracilis, the hoary comma, a butterfly species common in boreal North America
 Polyscias gracilis, a plant species endemic to Mauritius
 Potentilla gracilis, the slender cinquefoil or graceful cinquefoil, a plant species
 Pouteria gracilis, a plant species endemic to Peru
 Pradhania gracilis, a dinosaur species from the Early Jurassic
 Prinia gracilis, the graceful prinia, a small warbler species
 Protodiplatys gracilis, an extinct earwig species
 Pseudomyrmex gracilis, the elongate twig ant, an ant species
 Pugettia gracilis, the graceful kelp crab, a crab species

Synonyms 
 Palene gracilis, a synonym for Thallarcha sparsana, a moth found in Victoria, New South Wales and Queensland

See also 
 Gracilis (disambiguation)